Konrad Pettersson (1 July 1903 in Älvsbyn, Sweden – 18 November 1976 in Piteå, Sweden), was a Swedish cross-country skier. He won Vasaloppet in 1927. He represented Luleå SK in club competitions.

References 

1976 deaths
1903 births
Swedish male cross-country skiers
Vasaloppet winners
Cross-country skiers from Norrbotten County